National 

The Ardlussa Fishing Loch is an impounding reservoir, located 2 kilometres north of Lussagiven on a remote part of the Ardlussa Estate on Jura, Argyll and Bute, Scotland. The earthen dam is 5.5 metres high and was completed in 1900.

See also
 List of reservoirs and dams in the United Kingdom

Sources
"Argyll and Bute Council Reservoirs Act 1975 Public Register"

Reservoirs in Argyll and Bute
Jura, Scotland